Francesco Rinuccini or Francesco Ruccini (died 1678) was a Roman Catholic prelate who served as Bishop of Pistoia e Prato (1656–1678).

Biography
Francesco Rinuccini was born in Florence, Italy.
On 28 Aug 1656, he was appointed during the papacy of Pope Alexander VII as Bishop of Pistoia e Prato.
On 10 Sep 1656, he was consecrated bishop by Federico Sforza, Cardinal-Priest of Santi Silvestro e Martino ai Monti, with Annibale Bentivoglio, Titular Archbishop of Thebae, and Luca Torreggiani, Archbishop of Ravenna, serving as co-consecrators. 
He served as Bishop of Pistoia e Prato until his death on 11 Mar 1678.

While bishop, he was the principal co-consecrator of Celio Piccolomini, Titular Archbishop of Caesarea in Mauretania (1656) .

References

External links and additional sources
 (for Chronology of Bishops) 
 (for Chronology of Bishops) 

17th-century Italian Roman Catholic bishops
Bishops appointed by Pope Alexander VII
1678 deaths